Tomb of Nader Shah is a building in Mashhad designed by Hooshang Seyhoun.

History 

After Nader's successful campaign against the Mughal Empire, he returned to his homeland with immense wealth: the peacock throne, the Koh-i-Noor diamond, and “700 elephants, 4,000 camels and 12,000 horses carrying wagons all laden with gold, silver and precious stones”. Hiding his loot in the town of Kalat, Nader immediately ordered the Mughal craftsmen whom he had brought to Persia to build him a grandiose tomb in Mughal style — the Kakh-e-Khorshid, or ‘Palace of the Sun’.

Nader Shah’s assassination meant the tomb was never fully completed. The Kakhe-e-Khorshid was turned into a residence palace by various tribal leaders and Nader Shah’s body remained un-commemorated until the 1960s when a concrete monument was constructed for him in the vicinity of a heavily polluted traffic intersection in Mashhad.

Interior 
Despite its incomplete exterior, the interior of the Khorshid is fully refined: each doorway is decorated by miniature paintings and Mughal frescoes.

Gallery

Sources 

Mausoleums in Iran
Hooshang Seyhoun buildings
National works of Iran
Tourist attractions in Razavi Khorasan Province